Dorchester on Thames (or Dorchester-on-Thames) is a village and civil parish in Oxfordshire, about  northwest of Wallingford and  southeast of Oxford. The town is a few hundred yards from the confluence of the River Thames and River Thame. A common practice of the scholars at Oxford was to refer to the river Thames by two separate names, with Dorchester on Thames the point of change. Downstream of the village, the river continued to be named The Thames, while upstream it was named The Isis. Ordnance Survey maps continued the practice by labelling the river as "River Thames or Isis" above Dorchester, however, this distinction is rarely made outside the city of Oxford.

Etymology
The town shares its name with Dorchester in Dorset, but there has been no proven link between the two names. The name is likely a combination of a Celtic or Pre-Celtic element "-Dor" with the common suffixation "Chester" (Old English: "A Roman town or Fort"). As Dorchester on Thames is surrounded on three sides by water (and may have been founded at the point where the river became navigable), it is likely the name is linked to the Celtic word for water "dwfr" (or "dŵr" as in modern Modern Welsh), giving a meaning of "Fort on the Water" or "Water-town". This etymology was known as early as 1545 when it was used by John Leland in his epic poem Cygnea Cantio ("Song of the Swan"). In the poem Leland refers to the town with a Greek translation, Hydropolis ( "Water-city"). There is no surviving record of the settlement's Latin name, and Bede's reference to the town as "Dorcic" is otherwise unsupported.

History
The area has been inhabited since at least the Neolithic. In the north of the parish there was a Neolithic sacred site, now largely destroyed by gravel pits. On one of the Sinodun Hills on the opposite side of the Thames, a ramparted settlement was inhabited during the Bronze Age and Iron Age. Two of the Sinodun Hills bear distinctive landmarks of mature trees called Wittenham Clumps. Adjacent to the village is Dyke Hills which is the remains of an Iron Age hill fort. The Romans built a vicus here, with a road linking the settlement to a military camp at Alchester, 16 miles (25 km) to the north.

In 634 Pope Honorius I sent a bishop called Birinus to convert the Saxons of the Thames Valley to Christianity. King Cynegils of Wessex gave Dorchester to Birinus as the seat of a new Diocese of Dorchester under a Bishop of Dorchester; the diocese was extremely large, and covered most of Wessex and Mercia. The settled nature of the bishopric made Dorchester in a sense the de facto capital of Wessex, which was later to become the dominant kingdom in England. Eventually Winchester displaced it, with the bishopric being transferred there in 660. 

Briefly in the late 670s Dorchester was once more a bishop's seat under Mercian control. Dorchester again became the seat of a bishop in around 875, when the Mercian Bishop of Leicester transferred his seat there. The diocese merged with that of Lindsey in 971; the bishop's seat was moved to Lincoln in 1085. In the 12th century the church was enlarged to serve a community of Augustinian canons. King Henry VIII dissolved the Abbey in 1536, leaving the small village with a huge parish church.

Amenities
Dorchester Abbey is both the village's Church of England parish church and its main tourist attraction. The Abbey has a museum. Of the ten original coaching inns, two remain: The George and The White Hart. The George has a galleried yard dating back to 1495 and it used to serve coaches on the Gloucester-Oxford-London route. The George was used as a filming location for ITV's Agatha Christie's Poirot in the episode Taken at the Flood in 2006.

Festivals and events
Dorchester on Thames is the home of a number of annual events:
 The biennial Dorchester on Thames Festival, a 10-day fundraising event held every other May
 The English Music Festival

Nearby is Day's Lock on the Thames, where an annual "World Poohsticks Championship" is held.

Notable people
 Jonty Hearnden – auctioneer, antiques expert and television presenter
 Mark Wright – footballer and former England captain
 Tom Penny – professional skateboarder

References

Sources

Booth, P. (2014). A Late Roman Military Burial from the Dyke Hills, Dorchester on Thames, Oxfordshire. Britannia 45(4), 243–273.
Booth, P. (2012). The Discovering Dorchester-on-Thames project: A report on the excavations, 2007–2011. Dorchester-on-Thames: Parochial Church Council, Abbey Church of St. Peter and St. Paul.
Dawson Tim, Falys, Mundin, Pine, Platt, Falys, Ceri, et al. (2017). The Southern Cemetery of Roman Dorchester-on-Thames (Monograph (Thames Valley Archaeological Services) ; 29).
Dickinson, T. (1974). Cuddesdon and Dorchester-on-Thames, Oxfordshire: Two early Saxon princely sites in Wessex (BAR British series ; 1). Oxford: British Archaeological Reports.
Frere, S. (1964). Excavations at Dorchester on Thames, 1962. London: Royal Archaeological Institute.
Gibson, A. (1992). POSSIBLE TIMBER CIRCLES AT DORCHESTER‐ON‐THAMES. Oxford Journal of Archaeology, 11(1), 85–91.
 

Marshall, W. (2015). Dorchester-on-Thames, diocese of. The Oxford Companion to British History.
Morrison, W., & Crawford, S. (2013). Re-assessing Toys in the Archaeological Assemblage: A Case Study from Dorchester-on-Thames. Childhood in the Past, 6(1), 52–65.
Peveler, Edward C. (2016). Reassessing Roman ceramic building materials: Economics, logistics and social factors in the supply of tile to Dorchester on Thames, Oxfordshire. Arqueología De La Arquitectura, (13), Arqueología de la arquitectura, 13.

External links

Virtual tour of Dorchester Abbey via Google Street View

Villages in Oxfordshire
Populated places on the River Thames
Civil parishes in Oxfordshire
South Oxfordshire District